Papparapatti is a census town in Salem district in the Indian state of Tamil Nadu.

Demographics
As of the 2001 India census, Papparapatti had a population of 9020. Males constitute 52% of the population and females 48%. Papparapatti has an average literacy rate of 56%, lower than the national average of 59.5%: male literacy is 64%, and female literacy is 47%. In Papparapatti, 12% of the population is under 6 years of age.

References

Cities and towns in Salem district